Shí ([ʂɻ̩̌]) or Shih is the romanization of the Chinese surname . It means "stone." It was one of the "Nine Sogdian Surnames." A 2013 study found it was the 63rd most common surname, shared by 4,550,000 people or 0.340% of the population, with Henan being the province with the most people. It is romanized Shek in Cantonese.

It should not be confused with Shí (surname 時), a rarer surname meaning "time."

Notable people
 Domee Shi (石之予, Shí Zhīyǔ), Chinese-born Canadian animator, director and screenwriter
 Jenny Cheok Cheng Kid (石清菊 shí qīngjǘ), Singaporean bar waitress and murder victim
 Howard S.H. Shyr (石世豪), Chairperson of National Communications Commission of the Republic of China (2012–2016)
 Jeffrey "Trump" Shih (石謙和), American Hearthstone player
 Shi Feng (石峰), Chinese swimmer, who competed for China at the 2008 Summer Olympics in Beijing.
 Shi Hanqing, Chinese pool player and former professional snooker player
 Shi Hongjun (石鸿俊), Chinese footballer
 Shi Ke (石柯), Chinese footballer 
 Shi Le (石勒), a Later Zhao ruler from among the Jie
 Shi Shen (石申), a Wei astronomer
 Shi Shouxin (石守信), a military general in imperial China, first serving the Later Zhou during the last years of the Five Dynasties and Ten Kingdoms period
 Shi Xiaotian (石笑天), Chinese football player who currently plays for Chinese Super League 
 Shi Xin Hui (石欣卉), a Malaysian singer, who was one of the five popular new talents emerged from the Channel U's popular singing talent show, Project Superstar 2005 in Singapore
 Shi Yao (石瑶), Chinese female ice hockey goaltender
 Shi Zhiyong (weightlifter, born 1980) (石智勇), Chinese weightlifter, Olympic Champion during the 2004 Summer Olympics
 Shi Zhiyong (weightlifter, born 1993) (石智勇), Chinese weightlifter, Olympic Champion during the 2016 Summer Olympics
 Shi Zongyuan (石宗源), ethnic Hui, was a politician of the People's Republic of China
 Shih Chih-wei (石志偉), Taiwanese baseball player for the Lamigo Monkeys
 Shih Kien (石堅), Hong Kong-based Chinese actor
 Shih Su-mei (石素梅), Taiwanese politician, Minister of the Directorate-General of Budget, Accounting and Statistics (2008-2016)

See also 
Shi (Korean given name)
Shi (disambiguation)

References

Chinese-language surnames

Multiple Chinese surnames